The 2021 Louisiana's 2nd congressional district special election was held on March 20, 2021, with a runoff being held on April 24, 2021.

On November 17, 2020, incumbent Representative Cedric Richmond announced that he would resign from the United States House of Representatives to serve as the director of the Office of Public Liaison and as a Senior Advisor to Joe Biden. He did so on January 15, 2021, and took his new job when Biden assumed office on January 20, 2021. When congressional seats in Louisiana become vacant, the governor has the ability to call a special election at any time. The special election to fill Louisiana's 2nd congressional district took place on March 20, and a runoff was held on April 24. Democrat Troy Carter won the runoff election on April 24, 2021, against fellow Democrat Karen Peterson.

Primary candidates

Democratic Party
Of the Democratic candidates, Troy Carter, a state senator, Karen Carter Peterson, a state senator and former chair of the Louisiana Democratic Party, and Gary Chambers, an activist, were considered the frontrunners. Of these candidates, Carter was considered to be a moderate, while Peterson and Chambers were considered to be progressives. In the jungle primary, Carter and Peterson took first and second place with 36% and 23% of the vote, while Chambers took third place with 21%. Chambers' result was considered an overperformance, as he significantly outdid his polling numbers. On March 29, Chambers endorsed Peterson.

Declared
Troy Carter, state senator and candidate for this seat in 2006
Karen Carter Peterson, state senator, former chair of the Louisiana Democratic Party, and runoff-advanced candidate for this seat in 2006
Desiree Ontiveros, small business owner
Gary Chambers Jr., activist and candidate for Louisiana State Senate district 15 in 2019
Harold John, postal worker
J. Christopher Johnson, activist
Lloyd M. Kelly
Jenette M. Porter, small business owner

Republican Party

Declared
Chelsea Ardoin, HR professional
Claston Bernard, decathlete
Greg Lirette, information technology professional
Sheldon C. Vincent Sr., retired postal worker

Libertarian Party

Declared
Mindy McConnell, principal

No party affiliation

Declared
 Belden "Noonie Man" Batiste, activist and perennial candidate
Brandon Jolicoeur, actor

Endorsements

Jungle primary

Polling

Graphical summary

Predictions

Results

By Parish

Runoff 

A runoff was held on April 24 between Troy Carter and Karen Carter Peterson. In the April 24th runoff, Carter beat Peterson 48,513, 55.2%, to 39,297, 44.8%, with 87,810 votes reported from 100% of precincts.

Predictions

Endorsements

Results

By Parish

Notes
Additional candidates and polling key

Partisan clients

References

External links 

Official campaign websites
 Troy Carter (D) for Congress
 Karen Carter Peterson (D) for Congress

Louisiana 2021 02
Louisiana 2021 02
2021 02 Special
Louisiana 02 Special
United States House of Representatives 02 Special
United States House of Representatives 2021 02